is a professional Japanese baseball player. He plays outfielder for the Saitama Seibu Lions.

References 

1999 births
Living people
Baseball people from Osaka Prefecture
Nippon Professional Baseball outfielders
Saitama Seibu Lions players